McCarthy Square is a park in Manhattan, New York, named after Bernard Joseph McCarthy. The park and its memorial flagstaff, known as the Bernard McCarthy World War II Memorial, were dedicated in June 1943.

References

1943 establishments in New York City
Parks in Manhattan
West Village